Alborada del gracioso ("The Jester's Aubade", or other translations: see below) is a short orchestral piece by Maurice Ravel first performed in 1919. It is an orchestrated version of one of the five movements of his piano suite Miroirs, written in 1904–05. Originally created for a ballet, the work has entered the concert repertoire, and has been recorded frequently.

Title

The title, in Spanish, has no exact English translation. It has been various rendered as "Morning Song of the Clown",  "The Jester's Aubade", and "Morning Song of the Buffoon". Alborada, literally "dawn", has a variety of musical meanings: it can be a lively folk-dance, a Galician folk tune, a type of rhythmically free instrumental music played on bagpipes and small drum, a song for a wedding day, or, as it is usually construed in the context of Ravel's piece, a musical announcement of dawn, a sunrise song, the equivalent of a French or English aubade. In that sense, the roots of the term can be traced to the old troubadour and trouvère tradition in which the song portrayed the parting of two lovers at dawn. A gracioso was a figure from Spanish comedy, variously described as a jester or a clown, the classic genial buffoon, the standard grotesque lover, akin to Don Quixote, of ancient Castilian comedy, a humorous or amusingly entertaining person, and a servant or squire who often comments satirically on the actions of his superiors.

Background

In the years 1904–05, as he was finishing his String Quartet, Ravel composed Miroirs (Mirrors), a suite of five short piano pieces. He later orchestrated two of them: the orchestral version of "Un Barque sur l'ocean" (A Barque on the Ocean) came out in 1906; more than a decade elapsed before Ravel orchestrated the other, the "Alborado del gracioso".

The orchestration came about at the invitation of Sergei Diaghilev, the impresario of the Ballets Russes. He was well acquainted with Ravel, having commissioned from him the music for Daphnis et Chloé in 1909. Diaghilev visited Spain for the first time in 1916 and was so taken with the country that he commissioned several ballets on Spanish themes. The first appeared in the same year: Leonid Massine's Las meninas, inspired by Velázquez's painting of the same name. It was danced to a composite score that included "Alborada del gracioso" (in its piano version) along with Gabriel Fauré's Pavane and pieces by Louis Aubert and Emmanuel Chabrier. Diaghilev commissioned Ravel to orchestrate the Alborada (and the Chabrier piece, the Menuet pompeux) for a production of the ballet, retitled Les jardins d'Aranjuez, at the Alhambra Theatre, London in 1919. Before the ballet opened in London the orchestral Alborada was premiered in Paris on 17 May 1919 by the Pasdeloup Orchestra conducted by Rhené-Baton.

Music

The music consists of two sections of lively dance music, separated by a rhapsodic, extended song. The opening is marked assez vif (fairly quick), ♩ = 92. Like the piano original, the piece begins with imitations of guitar music. In the orchestral version they are produced by the first harp, played close to the sound board, along with precisely arranged pizzicato violins and violas.

The music is mainly quiet for the first 28 bars as the themes are established. They are then brought together in what the commentator Eric Bromberger describes as "a great explosion of sound, subtly tinted by Ravel's use of castanets, tambourine, cymbals and harp". and then a fortissimo chord introduces the central episode, a plaintive  melody for solo bassoon – the clown's song – alternating with shimmering string sonorities. To represent the sounds of the extreme treble of the piano original, the accompaniment to the bassoon melody is scored for 24-part strings, some instruments bowed, others plucked, and deploying a range of harmonics, multiple stops and sul tasto effects.

The music makes a gradual return to the original tempo; Ravel added four bars to the original score here, making use of woodwind tremolos. The piece builds to a conclusion and ends in what critics have variously described as "a blaze of orchestral color", "an exhilarating climax", and "a grand and glorious racket".

Recordings
The first recording of the orchestral Alborada del gracioso was made by the Berlin State Opera Orchestra, conducted by Otto Klemperer in 1926. Since then there have been numerous versions on record. In a comparative survey of recordings for BBC Radio 3, Rob Cowan short-listed the following:

Recordings recommended by other critics include:

In 2015 the conductor François-Xavier Roth and the orchestra Les Siècles, which specialises in historically informed performance, released a recording of the Alborada   using original or reproduction instruments of the period.

References and sources

References

Sources
 
 
 
 
 
 
 
 
 

Compositions for symphony orchestra
1904 compositions
1919 compositions
Compositions by Maurice Ravel